Franché Coma (born Frank Licata August 17, 1957), is an American musician. He is the original guitarist of the Misfits. Coma joined The Misfits in the fall of 1977 as the band's first guitarist eight months after singer Glenn Danzig, bassist Jerry Only, and drummer Manny Martinez formed the band. All of his recordings were recorded on the famous Static Age sessions in February 1978 at Mercury Records CI recording studio in NYC. Coma left The Misfits in the fall of 1978 and went on to play for the band Active Ingredients with his longtime friend Ashley Morance.

Equipment
Coma used a Gibson 1976 reissue Explorer with a DiMarzio Super Distortion humbucker pickup, an Electro-Harmonix Big Muff fuzz, an Ampeg V-4 amplifier head and V-2 cabinet, and Fender 8 gauge strings.

References

External links
Official website
Biography

1957 births
Living people
American punk rock guitarists
Horror punk musicians
People from Lodi, New Jersey
Misfits (band) members
Guitarists from New Jersey
American male guitarists
20th-century American guitarists
American people of Italian descent
American heavy metal guitarists